List of Basque rugby union players features rugby union players from the Basque Country autonomous community, Navarre and the French Basque Country

Men's internationals





Women's internationals

internationals

internationals

Basque heritage
List of Basque rugby union players features rugby union players with Basque heritage from the Basque diaspora.

World Cup players







See also
List of Basque footballers

References

   
Basque
rugby